Dan Duran is a Canadian actor and broadcaster, best known as a former co-anchor with Carla Collins of the Canadian entertainment news series ENow. He was more recently seen in the recurring role of the ill-fated "Man from Protected" in the well-received Canadian television series Cra$h & Burn.

In May 2011, he was announced as the morning show host on CJWV-FM, a new radio station in Peterborough, Ontario. His cohost is actor Linda Kash.

Filmography

Film

Television

References

External links
 

Year of birth missing (living people)
Living people
Canadian male television actors
Canadian male film actors
Canadian television hosts
Canadian radio hosts